Parivaar may refer to:

 Parivar (1967 film), a 1967 Bollywood drama film
 Parivaar (1987 film), a 1987 Hindi-language Indian film